Daniel Danklmaier (born 24 April 1993) is an Austrian alpine skier.

Career
He participatet at one editions of the Alpine Ski World Championships, at young level he won a silver medal in Super-G at the World Junior Alpine Skiing Championships 2014.

As often happens for speed events specialists, his explosion in the World Cup was a bit late, in fact it took place at the dawn of 29 years, in the World Cup 2022 season, in which he finished 5 times in the top ten, qualified both downhill and super-G for the Meribel finals (where only the first 25 of the ranking of each specialty are allowed), and finished 15th in the downhill world cup standings.

However, the blindfolded goddess was no friend to him, on 12 April 2022, in training in Solden, he suffered an injury to the meniscus and the cruciate ligament of his left leg.

World Cup results
Top 10

References

External links
 

1993 births
Living people
Austrian male alpine skiers